West End Brook is a small stream in southern England. It rises near the Hampshire village of Tadley. Its name is probably related to the parish, and village, it passes through for some of its course: Mortimer West End.

Route

The source of West End Brook is from springs near Strawberry Farm, to the north of Tadley and south of the Atomic Weapons Establishment at the former airfield of RAF Aldermaston. The springs are just above the  contour, to the north of the Hampshire county boundary in Berkshire, and very close to West's Meadow, Aldermaston Site of Special Scientific Interest (SSSI),  of unimproved meadows which are unusual, as the well-drained sandy soils remain damp, probably due to a layer of clay material beneath them. The meadows provide habitat for over 80 species of grassland plants, which for a small meadow is quite a high number. The stream travels east in a wooded corridor, passing through Upper Moor's Gulley to the south of AWE Aldermaston. A tributary joins the stream on its left bank, flowing south from Decoy Pond, a large pond within the AWE site. It is notable because it contains more species of breeding dragonfly and damselfly than anywhere else in Berkshire, and also includes rare Alder woodland.

Further east the stream is joined by another small stream on its right bank, rising from springs in Roundwood Gulley, and passes under Soke Road, which at that point briefly follows the course of a Roman road. It also crosses the county boundary into Hampshire at this location. The river continues through the woodland of Benyon's Inclosure, and enters Kiln Pond. An embankment carries a track over the pond, dividing it into two. By 1969, the upper area was again a pond, covering , and there were three sluices to allow water to pass through the embankment, with another sluice controlling the outflow from the lower pond. Just to the south of the pond is The Frith, an Iron Age Hill fort, where a single line of earthworks, which are quite modest in scale, enclose the top of a hill.

A stream flowing from two springs on Benyon's Inclosure joins on the left bank as it passes under Church Road, at which point it has already descended to  Above Ordnance Datum (AOD). The course of another Roman road crosses at Lovegrove's Farm and it is joined by another stream, draining from Hundred Acre Piece, a large area of woodland to the north. It passes under Turk's Lane, and as it turns to the south, it forms the county boundary between Hamsphire and Berkshire. After passing through Tanhouse Bridge, carrying Pitfield Lane over the river, it joins Foudry Brook on its left bank.

Water quality
The Environment Agency measure water quality of the river systems in England. Each is given an overall ecological status, which may be one of five levels: high, good, moderate, poor and bad. There are several components that are used to determine this, including biological status, which looks at the quantity and varieties of invertebrates, angiosperms and fish. Chemical status, which compares the concentrations of various chemicals against known safe concentrations, is rated good or fail.

The water quality of West End Brook was as follows in 2019.

Water quality on West End Brook dropped from moderate to bad in 2015, and the reasons for it not being good are mainly to do with physical modification of the channel, which prevents fish freely moving around the system, and the presence of the invasive species, the North American signal crayfish.

References

Rivers of Hampshire
Rivers of Berkshire
2WestEnd